The Ven. Robert Saville Brown  (12 September 1914 – 20 April 2001) was Archdeacon of Bedford from 1974 to 1979.
Brown was educated at Bedford Modern School and Selwyn College, Cambridge. He was ordained in 1941, served a curacy in Hitchin and held incumbencies at Wonersh (1947–53), Great Berkhamsted (1953 – 1969) and Bedford (1969–1974).

References

People educated at Bedford Modern School
Alumni of Selwyn College, Cambridge
Archdeacons of Bedford
1914 births
2001 deaths